Peter Anton (25 June 1850 – 10 December 1911) was a Scotland international rugby union player who represented Scotland in the 1872–73 Home Nations rugby union matches.

Rugby Union career

Amateur career

Anton was a divinity student at the University of St Andrews. He played as a forward for St. Andrews. He played for the team in the Scottish Unofficial Championship.

International career

He played in the Home Nations match in the 1872–73 season against England. This was the home match on 3 March 1873 at Hamilton Crescent, Glasgow. Years later, Anton described the international 'as hard an international that has ever been played'.

Personal life

Anton became a minister in the Church of Scotland. He wrote books on history, curling, angling, religion, and literature.

References

1850 births
1911 deaths
Alumni of the University of St Andrews
People educated at the High School of Dundee
Rugby union forwards
Rugby union players from Perth and Kinross
Scotland international rugby union players
Scottish rugby union players
University of St Andrews RFC players